Elvir Mekić (born 15 October 1981) is a Macedonian musician. He gained popularity after performing his single "Opasno" with Maja Sazdanovska at Ohrid Fest in 2007. He went on to release a second and third single from his debut album, Opasno, titled "Ušte Te Ima" and "Nekade Posle Dva", respectively. Mekić also competed in the 2008 Macedonian Eurovision qualifier, Skopje Fest 2008, with the song "Armija".

Early life and career
Of Bosniak origin, Mekić's career began when he was a teenager and his talent was soon discovered. His first song "Se Seknuvam" became very popular in the Republic of Macedonia. After successfully producing several singles, he took a break from producing his own music so he could begin writing lyrics for other artists that were popular in the Republic of Macedonia. He returned to music-making in 2007 with the song "Neka Te Zaboravi", of the studio album, Opasno.

After performing the song "Armija" at Skopje Fest 2008, Elvir, along with his best friend and fellow musician, Jovan Jovanov, organised a concert to be held in Skopje. Only one concert was planned for the 10 April 2008, but due to high ticket sales, a subsequent concert was scheduled for the following evening. In late 2008, Mekić collaborated with Serbian singer and former Đogani member, Slađa Delibašić. The pair released a Bosnian/Serbian single titled "5 Minuta". He wrote the lyrics for the Macedonian entry to the 2009 Eurovision Contest.

In 2010, he sang "Što je od Boga dobro je" with Bosnian singer Selma Bajrami on her album Selma 2010.

Discography

Studio album
Opasno (2007)
Kako Nov (2009)

Singles
2007: "Opasno" (featuring Maja Sazdanovska)
2007: "Ušte Te Ima"
2008: "Nekade Posle Dva"

References

External links
 Elvir Mekić on Myspace

1981 births
Living people
Bosniaks of Bosnia and Herzegovina
21st-century Macedonian male singers